The 2018 ICF Canoe Polo World Championships were held in Welland, Ontario, Canada.

Medals summary

References 
 

2018 in canoeing
ICF Canoe Polo World Championships